The Congress of Irish Unions was a confederation of trade unions in Ireland.

History
Congress was one of the two governing bodies that emerged after the split in the Irish trade union body the Irish Trades Union Congress in 1945. The split developed under pressure from an anticipated fresh labour-state relationship, and  alleged 'British domination in ITUC'. The CIU consisted entirely of Irish-based unions, and retained 77,500 workers, including the members of the Irish Transport and General Workers' Union. The aim of the CIU was to create  a trade union movement in Ireland which was Irish-based and nationalistic in outlook, in contrast to the more internationalist and  socialist ITUC which had 146,000 members. The Government, contrary to expectation, did not legislate against the  British unions, and from 1953 encouraged a détente between the two factions.
The confederations amalgamated in 1959, becoming the Irish Congress of Trade Unions .

Affiliates
On formation, the following unions affiliated to the Congress:

Building Workers' Trade Union
Dublin Typographical Provident Society
Electrical Trades Union (Ireland)
Electrotypers' and Stereotypers' Society
Irish Bookbinders' and Allied Trades Union
Irish Engineering Industrial Union
Irish National Union of Vintners', Grocers' and Allied Trade Assistants
Irish Seamen and Port Workers' Union
Irish Society of Woodcutting Machinists
Irish Transport and General Workers' Union
Irish Union of Distributive Workers and Clerks
Operative Plasterers' Trade Society
United Ship and House Painters' and Decorators' Trade Union

By 1954, the following unions held membership:

Secretaries
1945: Cathal O'Shannon
1946: Leo Crawford

Presidents

Source: Donal Nevin et al., Trade Union Century, pp. 438–439

References

Sources 
From the EMIRE database, which is the online version of the European Employment and Industrial Relations Glossaries

1945 establishments in Ireland
1959 disestablishments in Ireland
National trade union centres of Ireland
Trade unions established in 1945
Trade unions disestablished in 1959